Jančić is a surname. It may refer to:

Olga Jančić (1929–2012), Serbian sculptor
Zoran G. Jančić, Bosnian Serb pianist
Branko Jančić
Jovan Jančić who organized a rebellion in 1809 in Bosnia Eyalet.

See also
Jančić's rebellion, an 1809 rebellion led by ethnic Serbs in the Gradiška region against the Ottoman government in the Bosnia Eyalet

Serbian surnames